Broken Silence may refer to:

 Broken Silence (Foxy Brown album)
 Broken Silence (RBX album)
 "Broken Silence" (song), a 2003 single by So Solid Crew
 Broken Silence (1996 film), a 1996 film by Wolfgang Panzer
 Broken Silence (2001 film), a 2001 Spanish drama film